Un prete tra noi is an Italian drama television series. The title translates in English, "A priest among us." Un prete tra noi tells the story of Don Marco, a Catholic priest, who is assigned to penitentiary as a chaplain.

Cast
 Massimo Dapporto: Don Marco
 Julia Brendler: Maria
 Giovanna Ralli: Elisabetta 
 Robert Iaboni: Picchio
 Riccardo Cucciolla: Don Clemente 
 Gabriele Ferzetti: Ettore
 Michael Lonsdale: The Bishop
 Luigi Montini: Sandro Antonelli
 Carlo Croccolo: Paride Finizi
 Mattia Sbragia: Mattia Silvestri
 Rüdiger Vogler: Padre di Maria
 Marina Tagliaferri: Elene
 Alessio Boni: Gianni

See also
List of Italian television series

References

External links
 

Italian television series
RAI original programming